János Zsinka (born 2 October 1965) is a Hungarian former professional footballer who played as a forward. He made one appearance for the Hungary national team.

Club career 
Zsinka played for Ferencvárosi TC from 1984 to 1989 and for Újpest FC from 1990 to 1993, where he was a member of the 1992 Hungarian Cup winning team.

After 1993 he played one season for S.C. Lourinhanense and two seasons for S.C. Espinho in Portugal. He then played for Soroksár SC, where he finished his active sports career.

International career 
Zsinka made one appearance for the Hungary national team in 1989.

Honours 
 Nemzeti Bajnokság I: runner-up 1988–89, 1992–93
 Magyar Kupa: 1992; runner-up 1986
 UEFA European Under-19 Championship: gold medal 1984

References 

Living people
1965 births
People from Szentendre
Sportspeople from Pest County
Hungarian footballers
Association football forwards
Hungary international footballers
Nemzeti Bajnokság I
Nemzeti Bajnokság II
Fehérvár FC players
Volán FC players
Ferencvárosi TC footballers
Dunaújváros FC players
Budapest Honvéd FC players
Békéscsaba 1912 Előre footballers
Újpest FC players
Vác FC players
S.C. Espinho players
Hungarian expatriate footballers
Hungarian expatriate sportspeople in Portugal
Expatriate footballers in Portugal